2013 TBL Playoffs was the final phase of the 2012-13 Turkish Basketball League. It started on 17 May, 2013, and ended on June 15, 2013. Beşiktaş were the defending champions.

The eight highest placed teams of the regular season qualified for the playoffs. In the quarter-finals a best-of-three was played, in the semi-finals a best-of-five and in the finals a best-of-seven playoff format was used.

Galatasaray Medical Park competed against Banvit in the finals, won the series 4-1 and got their 5th championship.

Bracket

Quarterfinals

Galatasaray Medical Park vs. Tofaş

Anadolu Efes vs. TED Ankara Kolejliler

Banvit vs. Beşiktaş

Fenerbahçe Ülker vs. Pınar Karşıyaka

Semifinals

Galatasaray Medical Park vs. Pınar Karşıyaka

Anadolu Efes vs. Banvit

Finals

Galatasaray Medical Park vs. Banvit

References
TBL.org.tr
TBF.org.tr
TBLStat.net

Playoff
Turkish Basketball Super League Playoffs